The Elijah Parish Lovejoy Award is presented annually by Colby College to a member of the newspaper profession who has contributed to the country's journalistic achievement. The award is named for Elijah Parish Lovejoy, and established in 1952.

Award criteria 
The award was established to:
 Stimulate and honor the kind of achievement in the field of reporting, editing, and interpretive writing that continues the Lovejoy heritage of fearlessness and freedom.
 Promote a sense of mutual responsibility and cooperative effort between a newspaper world devoted to journalistic freedom and a liberal arts college dedicated to academic freedom.

The recipient is chosen, based on a selection committee's judgement of a journalist's integrity, craftsmanship, character, intelligence, and courage.

Recipients

See also
 Elijah Parish Lovejoy Award (to editors)

References

External links

Colby College
American journalism awards
Awards established in 1952
Elijah Parish Lovejoy Award recipients